Edgbaston Cricket Ground, also known as the County Ground or Edgbaston Stadium, is a cricket ground in the Edgbaston area of Birmingham, England. It is home to Warwickshire County Cricket Club and has been used for Test matches, One Day Internationals (ODI) and Twenty20 Internationals (T20I). The first Test match on the ground was played between England and Australia in 1902, the first ODI in 1962, again between England and Australia, and the first T20I in 2010 between Australia and Pakistan. The ground has hosted four Women's Test matches – the first of which was played between England and Australia in 1963 – one Women's One Day International and one Women's Twenty20 International.

In cricket, a five-wicket haul (also known as a "five-for" or "fifer") refers to a bowler taking five or more wickets in a single innings, which is regarded as a notable achievement. 

The first bowler to take a five-wicket haul in a Test match at Edgbaston was Wilfred Rhodes in 1902, who finished with bowling figures of 7 wickets for 17 runs. The first five-wicket haul in an ODI on the ground was taken by the West Indies' Vanburn Holder took 5 wickets for 50 runs against England in 1976. In women's cricket, only Enid Bakewell has taken a five-wicket haul on the ground, taking 7 wickets for 61 runs against the West Indies in a Test match in 1979.

Key

Test match five-wicket hauls

A total of 68 five-wicket hauls have been taken in Test cricket on the ground, 67 in men's matches and one in a women's match.

Men's matches

Women's matches

One Day Internationals

Eleven five-wicket hauls have been taken in ODIs on the ground, all in men's matches.

Notes

References

External links
International five-wicket hauls at Edgbaston, CricInfo

Edgbaston